Rodrigo Díaz de Vivar Gómez de Sandoval y Mendoza (4 April 1614 – 14 January 1657) was a Spanish noble of the House of Mendoza and the 7th Duke of the Infantado, serving in this office from 1633 until his death in 1657.

Family Origins 

The Dukedom of the Infantado had been in the hands of the Mendoza family since the very first duke, Diego Hurtado de Mendoza y Figueroa.  The Mendoza family rose to power when it merged with the House of Lasso de la Vega through the marriage of Leonor Lasso de la Vega, the last direct member of that line, and Admiral Diego Hurtado de Mendoza, the admiral of Castile.  He inherited the title from his grandmother, Ana de Mendoza y Enríquez de Cabrera.

Biography 

Rodrigo actively fought in the Portuguese Restoration War as a member of Philip IV of Spain's staff.  He also participated in putting down the Catalan Revolt and in the Siege of Lérida.  He was later named the Spanish ambassador to Rome, Governor of Milán, and Viceroy of Sicily.

He died in 1657 without leaving any heirs.  As such, the title of Duke of the Infantado passed on to his sister, the Duchess of Pastrana, Catalina Gómez de Sandoval y Mendoza which united the two houses and increased the power of the family.

Marriage 

Rodrigo married in 1630 with María de Silva y Guzmán, the daughter of Ruy III Gómez de Silva y Mendoza de la Cerda, the Duque de Pastrana. The couple never conceived any children.

References 
Much of the information on this page was translated from its Spanish equivalent.

1614 births
1657 deaths
7
Rodrigo
Viceroys of Sicily